Moody Centre station  is an intermodal rapid transit station in Metro Vancouver served by both the Millennium Line—part of the SkyTrain system—and the region's West Coast Express commuter rail system.

Moody Centre replaced the previous Port Moody station on the West Coast Express. The new station opened on December 2, 2016, along with the rest of the Evergreen Extension.

Station information

Station layout

Entrances

 Main Entrance : located near the southeast end of the platform. Passengers using either platform or connecting to West Coast Express must go through an overhead walkway to cross the tracks.
 West Coast Express Entrance : located northwest of the main entrance, also above the inbound platform (Platform 1). It provides direct access to the West Coast Express.

Transit connections

Moody Centre station provides a transit exchange at the south side of the station.  Bus bay assignments are as follows:

References

External links
Moody Centre Station

Buildings and structures in Port Moody
Evergreen Extension stations
Millennium Line stations
Railway stations in Canada opened in 2016
2016 establishments in British Columbia
West Coast Express stations